The Tikrit Museum is a museum located in Tikrit, Iraq. It was damaged during 2003 Iraq War.

References 

Museums in Iraq
Tikrit